The Grumman F7F Tigercat is a heavy fighter aircraft that served with the United States Navy (USN) and United States Marine Corps (USMC) from late in World War II until 1954. It was the first twin-engine fighter to be deployed by the USN. While the Tigercat was delivered too late to see combat in World War II, it saw action as a night fighter and attack aircraft during the Korean War.

Designed initially for service on Midway-class aircraft carriers, early production F7Fs were land-based variants. The type was too large to operate from older and smaller carriers, and only a late variant (F7F-4N) was certified for carrier service.

Design and development
Based on the earlier Grumman XP-50 that was eventually canceled, the company developed the XP-65 (Model 51) further for a future "convoy fighter" concept. In 1943, work on the XP-65 was terminated in favor of the design that would eventually become the F7F. The contract for the prototype XF7F-1 was signed on 30 June 1941. Grumman's aim was to produce a fighter that outperformed and outgunned all existing fighter aircraft, and that had an auxiliary ground attack capability.

Performance of the prototype and initial production aircraft met expectations; the F7F was one of the fastest piston-engine fighters, with a top speed significantly greater than single-engine USN aircraft — 71 mph faster than a Grumman F6F Hellcat at sea level. Captain Fred Trapnell, one of the premier USN test pilots of the era, stated: "It's the best damn fighter I've ever flown." The F7F was to be heavily-armed — four 20 mm cannon and four 50 caliber (0.50 in; 12.7 mm) machine guns, as well as underwing and under-fuselage hardpoints for bombs and torpedoes. This speed and firepower was bought at the cost of heavy weight and a high landing speed, but what caused the aircraft to fail carrier suitability trials was poor directional stability with only one engine operational, as well as problems with the tailhook design. The initial production series was, therefore, used only from land bases by the USMC, as night fighters with APS-6 radar.

While the F7F was initially also known as the Grumman Tomcat, this name was abandoned, because it was considered at the time to have excessively sexual overtones; (from the 1970s, the name Tomcat became commonly associated with, and officially used by the Navy for, another Grumman design, the F-14 twin-jet carrier-based interceptor).
The first production variant was the single-seat F7F-1N aircraft; after the 34th production aircraft, a second seat for a radar operator was added and these aircraft were designated F7F-2N.

A wing failure on a heavy landing caused the failure of this carrier qualification as well. F7F-3 aircraft were produced in day fighter, night fighter, and photo-reconnaissance versions.

The final production version, the F7F-4N, was extensively rebuilt for additional strength and stability, and did pass carrier qualification, but only 12 were built.

Operational history
Marine Corps night fighter squadron VMF(N)-513 flying F7F-3N Tigercats saw action in the early stages of the Korean War, flying night interdiction and fighter missions and shooting down two Polikarpov Po-2 biplanes. This was the only combat use of the aircraft.

Most F7F-2Ns were modified to control drones for combat training, and these gained bubble canopies over the rear cockpit for the drone controller. An F7F-2D used for pilot transitioning also had a rear sliding, bubble canopy.

In 1945, two Tigercats, serial numbers TT346 and TT349, were evaluated, but rejected by the British Royal Navy in favour of a naval version of the de Havilland Hornet.

Variants

XP-65
Proposed United States Army Air Forces pursuit fighter.
XF7F-1
Prototype aircraft, two built.
F7F-1 Tigercat
Twin-engine fighter-bomber aircraft, powered by two Pratt & Whitney R-2800-22W radial piston engines. First production version, 34 built.
F7F-1N Tigercat
Single-seat night fighter aircraft, fitted with an APS-6 radar.
XF7F-2N
Night-fighter prototype, one built.
F7F-2N Tigercat
Two-seat night fighter, 65 built.
F7F-2D
Small numbers of F7F-2Ns converted into drone control aircraft. The aircraft were fitted with a Grumman F8F Bearcat windshield behind the cockpit.
F7F-3 Tigercat
Single-seat fighter-bomber aircraft, powered by two Pratt & Whitney R-2800-34W radial piston engines and featuring an enlarged tailfin for improved stability at high altitudes, 189 built.
F7F-3N Tigercat
Two-seat night fighter aircraft, 60 built.
F7F-3E Tigercat
Small numbers of F7F-3s were converted into electronic warfare aircraft.
F7F-3P Tigercat
Small numbers of F7F-3s were converted into photo-reconnaissance aircraft.
F7F-4N Tigercat
Two-seat night-fighter aircraft, fitted with a tailhook and other naval equipment, 12 built.

Operators
 
 United States Marine Corps
 United States Navy

Surviving aircraft

Beginning in 1949, F7Fs were flown to the then-U.S. Navy storage facility at Naval Air Station Litchfield Park, Arizona. Although the vast majority of the airframes were eventually scrapped, a number of examples were purchased as surplus. The surviving Tigercats were primarily used as water bombers to fight wildfires in the 1960s and 1970s and Sis-Q Flying Services of Santa Rosa, California, operated an F7F-3N tanker in this role until retirement in the late 1980s. 

 Airworthy
 F7F-3
 80374: based at the National Museum of World War II Aviation in Colorado Springs, Colorado.
 80375: based at the National Museum of World War II Aviation in Colorado Springs, Colorado.
 80390: based at Lewis Air Legends in San Antonio, Texas.
 80411: based at Palm Springs Air Museum in Palm Springs, California.
 80425: privately owned in  Seattle, Washington.
 80483: privately owned in  Houston, Texas.
 80503: based at Lewis Air Legends in San Antonio, Texas.
 80532: privately owned in Bentonville, Arkansas.

 On display
 F7F-3
 80373: National Naval Aviation Museum in Naval Air Station Pensacola, Florida.
 80382: Planes of Fame Air Museum in Chino, California.
 80410: Pima Air & Space Museum, adjacent to Davis–Monthan Air Force Base, in Tucson, Arizona.
 Under restoration or in storage
 F7F-3
 80404: in storage at the Fantasy of Flight in Polk City, Florida.

Specifications (F7F-4N Tigercat)

See also

References
Notes

Bibliography

 Bridgman, Leonard (ed.). "The Grumman Tigercat." Jane's Fighting Aircraft of World War II. London: Studio, 1946. .
 Carlson, Ted. "Semper Fi Tigercat". Flight Journal, Volume 13, Issue 2, April 2008.
 Carr, Orrin I. "Fire 'Cat!" Air Classics, Vol. 12, No. 9, Sept. 1976. Canoga Park, CA: Challenge Publications, pp. 38–47.
 Dorr, Robert F. and David Donald. Fighters of the United States Air Force. London: Temple, 1990. .
 Gault, Owen. "Grumman's Tiger Twins: The Skyrocket & Tigercat". Air Classics, Vol. 9, No. 8, Aug. 1973. Canoga Park, CA: Challenge Publications, pp. 22–27.
 Green, William. "Grumman F7F-1 – F7F-3 Tigercat". War Planes of the Second World War, Volume Four: Fighters London: Macdonald & Co.(Publishers) Ltd., 1961, pp. 106–108. .
 Green, William and Gordon Swanborough. "Grumman F7F Tigercat". WW2 Fact Files: US Navy and Marine Corps Fighters. London: Macdonald and Jane's Publishers Ltd., 1976, pp. 57–61. .
 Grossnick, Roy A. and William J. Armstrong. United States Naval Aviation: 1910–1995. Annapolis, MA: Naval Historical Center, 1997. .
 Legg, David. "Tigercat on camera". Aircraft Illustrated, Volume 24, no. 1, January 1991.
 Meyer, Corwin ("Corky") H. "F7F Tigercat: The Untold Story". Flight Journal, August 2002. Ridgefield, CT: AirAge Publications. pp. 48–56, 58.
 Morgan, Eric B. "Grumman F7F Tigercat F.7/30". Twentyfirst Profile, Volume 1, No. 11. New Milton, Hants, UK: 21st Profile Ltd. ISSN 0961-8120.
 Morgan, Eric B. "The Grumman Twins". Twentyfirst Profile, Volume 2, No. 15. New Milton, Hants, UK: 21st Profile Ltd. ISSN 0961-8120.
 O'Leary, Michael. "Tigercat Restoration". Air Classics, Vol. 38, No. 11, Nov. 2002. Canoga Park, CA: Challenge Publications.
 O'Leary, Michael. United States Naval Fighters of World War II in Action. Poole, Dorset, UK: Blandford Press, 1980. .
 Taylor, John W.R. "Grumman F7F Tigercat". Combat Aircraft of the World from 1909 to the Present. New York: G.P. Putnam's Sons, 1969. .
 Thruelsen, Richard. The Grumman Story. New York: Praeger Publishers, Inc., 1976. .
 Zuk, Bill. Janusz Zurakowski: Legends in the Sky. St. Catharine's, Ontario: Vanwell, 2004. .

External links

Manual: (1949) AN 01-85FA-1 Pilot's Handbook for Navy Model F7F-1N, F7F-2N, F7F-3, F7F-3N, F7F-4N Airplanes
 Naval Aviation Museum: F7F History & Pictures
 F7F Tigercat "Big Bossman" air Racer
 F7F Tigercat Flight Demonstration by Clay Lacy

F07F Tigercat
1940s United States fighter aircraft
Carrier-based aircraft
Mid-wing aircraft
Aircraft first flown in 1943
Twin piston-engined tractor aircraft